Garamduz-e Gharbi Rural District is in Garamduz District of Khoda Afarin County, East Azerbaijan province, Iran. At the National Census of 2006, its constituent villages were in Garamduz Rural District of Khoda Afarin District in Kaleybar County. There were 8,826 inhabitants in 2,291 households at the following census of 2011, by which time Khoda Afarin District had been elevated to the status of a county and divided into three parts: the Central District, Garamduz District, and Minjavan District. At the most recent census of 2016, the population of the rural district was 8,308 in 2,503 households. The largest of its 26 villages was Larijan, with 1,094 people.

References 

Khoda Afarin County

Rural Districts of East Azerbaijan Province

Populated places in East Azerbaijan Province

Populated places in Khoda Afarin County

fa:دهستان گرمادوز غربي